The 2019–20 Super League 2 was the first season of the Super League 2, the second-tier Greek professional league for association football clubs, since restructuring of the Greek football league system.

The exact system of conduct and how many teams will be promoted and how many will be relegated will be finalized in the summer when the final calls for professional bids are made public. It has been decided to hold Championship Round with the first 6 teams and Relegation Round with the last 6 teams of the regular season.

The league was suspended on 3 October after failing to reach an agreement with state broadcaster ERT.
After reaching an agreement with state broadcaster ERT the league resumed on 25 October.

Team allocation

Teams

The following 12 clubs are competing in the Super League 2 during the 2019–20 season.

Personnel and sponsoring

League table

Results

Top scorers

References

2
Second level Greek football league seasons
Greece
Greece 2